Defending champion Thomas Muster defeated Albert Costa in the final, 6–3, 5–7, 4–6, 6–3, 6–2 to win the singles tennis title at the 1996 Monte Carlo Open.

Seeds
The top eight seeds received a bye to the second round. 

  Thomas Muster (champion)
  Andre Agassi (third round)
  Michael Chang (second round)
  Boris Becker  (third round)
  Goran Ivanišević (second round)
  Yevgeny Kafelnikov (second round)
  Thomas Enqvist (second round)
  Jim Courier (second round)
  Sergi Bruguera (second round)
  Marc Rosset (first round)
  Arnaud Boetsch (second round)
  Andriy Medvedev (third round)
  Marcelo Ríos (semifinals)
  Todd Martin (first round)
  Renzo Furlan (second round, withdrew)
  Albert Costa (finalist)

Draw

Finals

Top half

Section 1

Section 2

Bottom half

Section 3

Section 4

External links
 1996 Monte Carlo Open draw

1996 Monte Carlo Open